Gopala Mishra (born 15th century) was a 16th-century Vaishnava poet and scholar from Kamrup region of Assam. Gopala Mishra was disciple and colleague of Damodara Deva.

See also
 Hema Saraswati
 Bhusana Dvija

References

Kamrupi literary figures
Kamrupi poets
15th-century Indian poets
1400 births
Year of death unknown
Indian male poets